Child & Co. was a private bank in the United Kingdom, which was part of NatWest Group. The Royal Bank of Scotland incorporating Child & Co., Bankers was previously based at 1 Fleet Street on the western edge of the City of London, beside Temple Bar Memorial and opposite the Royal Courts of Justice. RBS London Childs branch closed in June 2022 and it is no longer listed as one of the NatWest Group brands.

History 

Child & Co. was the third oldest bank in the world and was the oldest bank in the UK, predating the Bank of England.

Early beginnings
Child & Co. traced its roots to a London goldsmith business in the late 17th century, whose premises were known by the sign of the Marygold. Sir Francis Child established his business as a goldsmith in 1664, when he entered into partnership with Robert Blanchard. Child married Blanchard's stepdaughter and inherited the whole business on Blanchard's death. Renamed Child & Co., the business thrived, and was appointed the "jeweller in ordinary" to King William III.

Sir Francis Child took over most of the assets of Coggs & Dann a goldsmith banker "at the sign of the Kings Head in the Strand, over against St. Clement Danes Church", after the bank became insolvent in 1710 due to a massive fraud, orchestrated by gentleman fraudster Thomas Brerewood, which became known as the Pitkin Affair.

After Child died in 1713, his three sons ran the business and during this time the business transformed from a goldsmith's to a fully fledged bank. The bank claimed it was the first to introduce a pre-printed cheque form, prior to which customers simply wrote a letter to their bank but sent it to their creditor who presented it for payment. Its first bank note was issued in 1729.

Sarah Fane, Countess of Westmorland
By 1782, Child's grandson Robert Child was the senior partner in the firm. However, when he died in 1782 without any sons to inherit the business, he did not want to leave it to his only daughter, Sarah Anne Child, because he was furious over her elopement with John Fane, 10th Earl of Westmorland earlier in the year.  To prevent the Earls of Westmorland from ever acquiring his wealth, he left it in trust to his daughter's second surviving son or eldest daughter. This turned out to be Lady Sarah Sophia Fane, who was born in 1785. Between the death of Robert Child in 1782 and until 1793, the bank was managed by his widow, Sarah Child. Her and Robert's granddaughter Sarah Sophia Fane married George Child-Villiers, 5th Earl of Jersey in 1804 and upon her majority in 1806 she became senior partner. She exercised her rights personally until her death in 1867. At that point the Earl of Jersey and Frederick William Price of Harringay House were appointed as the two leading partners. Ownership continued in the Jersey family until the 1920s.

Later periods, and Glyn, Mills & Co.
George, 8th Earl of Jersey sold the firm to Glyn, Mills, Currie, Holt & Co. in 1924, who retained it as a separate business. Glyn, Mills & Co. was in turn acquired by The Royal Bank of Scotland in 1931 and merged with Williams Deacon's Bank to form Williams & Glyn's Bank in 1969. Williams and Glyn's Bank was fully integrated into The Royal Bank of Scotland in 1985 and ceased to operate separately.

A branch was opened in Oxford in 1932. During World War II, the main banking departments were evacuated to Osterley in West London and in 1942, the Oxford branch was transferred to Martins Bank. In 1977, a representative office was once again opened at St. Giles’ in Oxford.

Location
Since Temple Bar was removed and the street widened in 1880, Child & Co. occupied a Grade II* listed building, designed by John Gibson. The bank has previously operated from the same Fleet Street site since 1673. The branch was refurbished in 2015.

In February 2022, Child & Co. wrote to its clients informing them of the closure of the branch.

Clientele
Over their 350-year history Child & Co. attracted an exclusive client base including the Honourable Societies of Middle Temple and Lincoln's Inn and numerous landowning families. A number of Oxford colleges and several universities, including the London School of Economics and Imperial College London were reported to hold accounts. 

Child & Co. has a legal and professional services hub that supported many of the biggest law firms in the UK, as well as three of the Big Four accounting firms in the UK.

It is believed that the bank became the model for Charles Dickens' fictitious Tellson's Bank, in A Tale of Two Cities (1859).

Relationship with Royal Bank of Scotland
Child & Co. was authorised by the Prudential Regulation Authority and regulated by both the Financial Conduct Authority and the Prudential Regulation Authority.

For the purposes of the Financial Services Compensation Scheme, it operated as a brand of the Royal Bank of Scotland.

See also

Adam and Company
Coutts
Drummonds Bank
Holt's Military Banking

References
Notes

Bibliography

Donald Adamson, "Child’s Bank and Oxford University in the Eighteenth Century", The Three Banks Review, December 1982, pp. 45–52

Philip Clarke  The FIrst House in the City (1973)

External links
 
 History of Child & Co.

Private banks
Royal Bank of Scotland
Organisations based in the City of London
Banks established in 1664
1664 establishments in England
Banking in Great Britain